The 1967 Dartmouth Indians football team was an American football team that represented Dartmouth College during the 1967 NCAA University Division football season. Following two championship-winning years, Dartmouth fell to second in the Ivy League.

In their 13th season under head coach Bob Blackman, the Indians compiled a 7–2 record and outscored opponents 205 to 146. Stephen Luxford was the team captain.

The Indians' 5–2 conference record placed second in the Ivy League standings. They outscored Ivy opponents 153 to 128. 

Dartmouth played its home games at Memorial Field on the college campus in Hanover, New Hampshire.

Schedule

References

Dartmouth
Dartmouth Big Green football seasons
Dartmouth Indians football